Decima was one of the three Parcae (known in English as the Fates) in Roman mythology. The Parcae goddess Nona was responsible for pregnancy; Decima was responsible for birth; and Morta was charged with overseeing death. They distributed to mankind all the good and bad things in life, and according to some classical writings even Jupiter had to bend to their will. Decima measured the thread of life with her rod, like her Greek equivalent Lachesis. In some accounts, her mother was Nox the goddess of night and her father was Erebus the god of darkness; while in other accounts, her parents were Jupiter and Themis.

See also

Moirai
Norns

References

Citations

Sources
 
 

Parcae
Roman goddesses
Time and fate goddesses
Textiles in folklore